Rostislav Azarovich Soldatenko (born 25 May 1997) is a Russian football player. He plays for FC Alania Vladikavkaz.

Club career
He made his debut in the Russian Professional Football League for FC Neftekhimik Nizhnekamsk on 8 October 2015 in a game against FC Dynamo Kirov.

On 30 October 2016, he scored a goal for FC SKA Rostov-on-Don against FC Chayka Peschanokopskoye after kicking the ball off from his own penalty box.

He made his Russian Football National League debut for FC Dynamo Saint Petersburg on 6 May 2018 in a game against FC Baltika Kaliningrad.

On 16 July 2019, he joined FC Alania Vladikavkaz on loan. On 4 August 2020, Alania bought out his rights from Sochi and signed a three-year contract with him.

References

External links
 Profile by Russian Professional Football League

1997 births
Sportspeople from Vladikavkaz
Living people
Russian footballers
Russia youth international footballers
Association football goalkeepers
FC Spartak Vladikavkaz players
FC Neftekhimik Nizhnekamsk players
FC SKA Rostov-on-Don players
FC Dynamo Saint Petersburg players
PFC Sochi players
Russian First League players
Russian Second League players